Monodactylus is a genus of moonyfishes found in fresh, brackish and marine waters from the eastern Atlantic, through the Indian to the western Pacific oceans.

Species
There are currently four recognized species in this genus:
 Monodactylus argenteus (Linnaeus, 1758) (Silver moony)
 Monodactylus falciformis Lacépède, 1801 (Full moony)
 Monodactylus kottelati Pethiyagoda, 1991 (Dwarf moony)
 Monodactylus sebae (G. Cuvier, 1829) (African moony)

References

Monodactylidae
Taxa named by Bernard Germain de Lacépède